The Christian Admiral, formerly Admiral Hotel and Hotel Cape May, was a luxury hotel located in Cape May, New Jersey. Demolished in 1996, it was once the world's largest hotel, known for its majestic architecture and association with Carl McIntire's Christian movement.

History

The Christian Admiral Hotel, originally known as the Hotel Cape May, was erected in the Beaux-Arts style between 1905 and 1908. When opened on April 11, 1908 it was the world's largest hotel with 333 guest rooms. Completed behind schedule and over budget, Hotel Cape May was part of a development project intended to bring wealthy visitors to the city and rival East Coast resorts such as Newport, Rhode Island. During its existence it would undergo five bankruptcies and ownership changes. 
 
In 1962 the hotel was acquired by the Christian Beacon Press, headed by the Rev. Dr. Carl McIntire, for use as a bible study and conference center. The conference facilities were expanded and substantial sums of money were spent to bring the hotel into compliance with building codes. Carl McIntire said preserving old buildings is American.

In 1991, the hotel was closed by Cape May City officials. The hotel was demolished in 1996 and the site was reused for a development of single family homes. The demolition of the hotel placed the city's National Historic Landmark status at risk.

References

Cape May, New Jersey
Buildings and structures in Cape May County, New Jersey
Beaux-Arts architecture in New Jersey
Demolished buildings and structures in New Jersey
Hotel buildings completed in 1908
Buildings and structures demolished in 1996
1908 establishments in New Jersey
Convention centers in New Jersey
Defunct hotels in New Jersey